This article contains events from the year 1568 in France.

Incumbents
 Monarch – Charles IX

Events
February to March – Siege of Chartres
23 March – Peace of Longjumeau

Births
  
11 February – Honoré d'Urfé, novelist (died 1625).

Full date missing
Charlotte Catherine de La Trémoille, noblewoman (died 1629)
Nikolaus Ager, botanist (died 1634)

Deaths

Full date missing
Charlotte de Laval, noblewoman (born 1530)
Pierre Bontemps, sculptor (born c. 1505)
Antoine Héroet, poet

See also

References

1560s in France